Sirisha Bandla ( 1988) is an Indian-American aeronautical engineer. She's the Vice President of Government Affairs and Research Operations for Virgin Galactic. She flew on the Virgin Galactic Unity 22 mission which made her the second India-born woman to go to space and the fourth person of Indian descent ever to go past the line of space after Rakesh Sharma, Kalpana Chawla and Sunita Williams.

Early life and education 
Bandla was born into a Telugu-speaking Hindu family in the Guntur district of Andhra Pradesh, India. After her birth, Bandla's family moved to Tenali in Guntur. Until the age of five, Bandla split her time between her grandfather's house in Hyderabad, and her grandmother's house in Tenali. Bandla later moved to Houston, United States with her parents.

Bandla received her bachelor's degree in aeronautical engineering from Purdue University. She subsequently achieved her master's degree in business administration from The George Washington University.

Career 
Bandla hoped to become a NASA astronaut but was ruled out on medical grounds due to her eyesight. She previously worked for the Commercial Spaceflight Federation as an aerospace engineer with Matthew Isakowitz. She later co-founded the Matthew Isakowitz Fellowship in his honor.

Bandla joined Virgin Galactic in 2015, where she works as the vice president of government affairs. On Sunday 11 July 2021 Bandla flew on the Virgin Galactic Unity 22 test flight alongside Sir Richard Branson, Dave Mackay, Michael Masucci, Beth Moses, Colin Bennett. During the flight, Bandla conducted an experiment from the University of Florida to investigate how plants react to the change in gravity. About her flight, Bandla's grandfather, Dr Bandla Ragaiah, said: “From a very young age she had this ambition to explore the sky, the moon, and the stars. Sirisha had set her eyes on space, and I am not at all surprised that she is all set to realise her dream." During her spaceflight, she reached a height of 89.9 km above the Earth's surface. However, as she was not a member of the Flight Crew (as VF-01 was an automated launch), she is classified by the Federal Aviation Authority as a Space Tourist.

She was honored as one of the BBC 100 Women in December 2022.

See also 

 List of Asian American astronauts
 List of female spacefarers
 Telugu Americans

External links 
 Sirisha Bandla: “It’s interesting how much of a mental barrier there is for people when they see somebody they can’t relate to, doing what they want” - Vogue India, November 2021.

References 

1980s births
Living people
American women engineers
People who have flown in suborbital spaceflight
American people of Telugu descent
American people of Indian descent
Commercial astronauts
Virgin Galactic
George Washington University alumni
Telugu people
People from Guntur district
People from Houston
Purdue University alumni
Purdue University School of Aeronautics and Astronautics alumni
Indian emigrants to the United States
Engineers from Andhra Pradesh
Women scientists from Andhra Pradesh
Year of birth missing (living people)
BBC 100 Women